The Pyramid Lake Fault Zone is an active right lateral-moving (dextral) geologic fault located in western Nevada.  It is considered an integral part of the Walker Lane.

The fault zone extends to the southeast from Pyramid Lake roughly parallel to the course of the Truckee River between the Truckee Range to the northeast and the Pah Rah Range to the southwest.

The Pyramid Lake Fault is the easternmost of a series of en echelon faults of the Walker Lane straddling the Nevada – California border. The parallel striking faults to the west are the Warm Springs Valley Fault, the Honey Lake Fault, and the Mohawk Valley Fault.

References

Additional reading
Late Pleistocene fault slip rate, earthquake recurrence, and recency of slip along the Pyramid Lake fault zone, northern Walker Lane, United States
USGS Database

Seismic faults of Nevada